Redux may refer to:

Arts and media
Redux (literary term), an adjective meaning "brought back, restored" used in literature, film and video game titles
"Redux" (The X-Files), a two-part episode of The X-Files
"Redux" (Homeland), an episode of Homeland
Redux (album), an album by Adam Ant
Redux (EP), an EP by Amebix
Redux: Dark Matters, a Dreamcast video game subsequently released online

Other uses
Redux (adhesive), an aircraft adhesive
Redux (drug), a weight-loss drug withdrawn in 1997
Redux (JavaScript library), a JavaScript library for managing state of user interfaces

See also
Redus, surname
Remix
Redox